Shchaslyve is a name of several populated places in Ukraine

 Shchaslyve, Boryspil Raion, Kyiv Oblast
 Shchaslyve, Zghurivka Raion, Kyiv Oblast
 Shchaslyve, Zakarpattia Oblast
 Shchaslyve, Zaporizhia Oblast
 Shchaslyve, Lviv Oblast
 Shchaslyve, Kirovohrad Oblast
 Shchaslyve, Crimea
 Shchaslyve, Kherson Oblast